Mount Darwin Airport  is an airport serving Mount Darwin, in Mashonaland Central Province, Zimbabwe.

See also
Transport in Zimbabwe
List of airports in Zimbabwe

References

 Google Earth

External links
Mount Darwin Airport
OurAirports - Mount Darwin
OpenStreetMap - Mount Darwin

Airports in Zimbabwe
Buildings and structures in Mashonaland Central Province